John Trethowan (28 October 1936 – 1 April 2020) was an Australian rules footballer who played with South Melbourne in the Victorian Football League (VFL).

Notes

External links 		
		
		
		
		
		
		
2020 deaths		
1936 births
Australian rules footballers from Melbourne
Sydney Swans players
People from Rockbank, Victoria